Strontium acetate is a compound of strontium. It is a white solid and is soluble in water like other acetates. It is used as a pathway for other chemicals such as barium acetate.

Preparation
Strontium acetate is formed by reacting strontium hydroxide or strontium carbonate in acetic acid.

References

Strontium compounds
Acetates